Arjan Singh Āulakh (born 12 August 1974), known by the stage name Arj Barker, is an American comedian and actor from San Anselmo, California. He has toured in North America, Australia, New Zealand and Europe. He was born to an engineer father and artist mother, his father is of Indian Punjabi Sikh descent and his mother is of European descent.

Career

Barker started his career in comedy after graduating from high school in 1989. His first gigs were at an old café called Caffe Nuvo in downtown San Anselmo where he hosted stand-up night every Sunday throughout the early 1990s. Barker appeared on Premium Blend in 1997, followed by appearances on the shows Late Night with Conan O'Brien and The Glass House. He twice hosted Comedy Central Presents, first on 20 September 2000 and again on 31 March 2006. Barker was featured in Comedy Central's animated series Shorties Watchin' Shorties. He appeared on the Australian show Thank God You're Here on 18 October 2006, 19 September 2007 and 17 June 2009.

Barker co-wrote and performed in The Marijuana-Logues, an Off-Broadway show in New York City, with Doug Benson and Tony Camin. The title of the show was a parody of The Vagina Monologues. NBC gave Barker the lead role for sitcom Nearly Nirvana, originally scheduled for 2004. However, Barker was replaced in the lead role by the show's creator, Ajay Sahgal, and the show never aired.

Barker appeared in the HBO sitcom Flight of the Conchords, playing Bret and Jemaine's indifferent friend Dave. Barker has enjoyed success in Australia for a number of years since first appearing at the Melbourne International Comedy Festival in 2000, and presently resides there. At the ARIA Music Awards of 2019 he won Best Comedy Release for Organic.

Arj and Poopy
Barker also has his own Flash series, Arj and Poopy, based on some of his stand-up material, that stars him and his cat, Poopy, who talks by farting. The series is animated by Bernard Derriman, and has been syndicated to AtomFilms.

The episode "Unlucky in Love" won the Annecy International Animated Film Festival Internet Selection in 2006.

List of episodes
 "Experimentation"
 "Venetian Rowing Machine"
 "Philosopher"
 "Brutally Ambushed"
 "Long Distance Relationship"
 "Shpants"
 "Unlucky in Love"
 "Yoga"
 "Oh, Christmas tree"
 "Congo Windfall"
 "Poetreet"

Last Comic Standing
Barker was featured as a contestant on the first episode of the fifth season of Last Comic Standing, where he advanced to the Los Angeles semi-final round. He then failed to progress to the final 10 in the semi-final round.

Discography

Albums

DVD releases

Awards

ARIA Music Awards
The ARIA Music Awards is an annual awards ceremony that recognises excellence, innovation, and achievement across all genres of Australian music. Barker has won one award from four nominations.

! 
|-
|  2010
| Arj Barker Forever
| rowspan="4"| Best Comedy Release
| 
| rowspan="4"|
|-
|  2012
| Joy Harvest
| 
|-
|  2017
| Get In My Head
| 
|-
|  2019
| Organic
| 
|-

References

External links

 Official website
 

1974 births
Living people
American stand-up comedians
American male actors of Indian descent
ARIA Award winners
Male actors from San Francisco
American male comedians
People from San Anselmo, California
Comedians from California
20th-century American comedians
21st-century American comedians